Cristina Plazas (born 30 September 1969) is a Spanish actress. She appeared in more than fifty films since 1999. she's known for her secondary role in the TV serial Vis a Vis:it:Vis a vis - Il prezzo del riscatto

Selected filmography

References

External links 

1969 births
Living people
Spanish film actresses
21st-century Spanish actresses
Spanish television actresses